In telecommunications, the coverage of a radio station is the geographic area where the station can communicate. Broadcasters and telecommunications companies frequently produce coverage maps to indicate to users the station's intended service area. Coverage depends on several factors, such as orography (i.e. mountains) and buildings, technology, radio frequency and perhaps most importantly for two-way telecommunications the sensitivity and transmit efficiency of the consumer equipment. Some frequencies provide better regional coverage, while other frequencies penetrate better through obstacles, such as buildings in cities. 

The ability of a mobile phone to connect to a base station depends on the strength of the signal. That may be boosted by higher power transmissions, better antennas, taller antenna masts or alternative solutions like in-building picocells. Normal Macro-Cell signals need to be boosted to pass through buildings, which is a particular problem designing networks for large metropolitan areas with modern skyscrapers, hence the current drive for small cells and micro and pico cells. Signals also do not travel deep underground, so specialized transmission solutions are used to deliver mobile phone coverage into areas such as underground parking garages and subway trains.

Coverage noticer 
A coverage noticer is a device that beeps (or vibrates) when in a zone that lacks coverage (white spot). This is fundamental for critical services (security, emergency and so on). When the user goes to a covered area, the noticer ceases beeping. Similarly coverage maps are often used to visualize coverage, these are produced by networks themselves as well as independent companies.

Coverage noticers can be integrated in a mobile phone also and several apps exist to show coverage maps on devices, including OpenSignal.

See also 
 Femtocell
 Footprint (satellite)
 Mobile phone
 Mobile computing
 Pass (spaceflight)
 Roaming
 Telecommunications network
 White spot
 Wireless

External links 
 Understanding Cell Phone Coverage Areas.   FCC Consumer Facts.
  

Mobile telecommunications
Radio
Telecommunications infrastructure